Tasiusaq Heliport  is a heliport in Tasiusaq, a village in the Upernavik Archipelago of Avannaata municipality in northwestern Greenland. The heliport is considered a helistop, and is served by Air Greenland as part of a government contract.

There is also a heliport with the same name located in the village of Tasiusaq in the Kujalleq municipality in southern Greenland.

Airlines and destinations 

Air Greenland operates government contract flights to villages in the Upernavik Archipelago. These mostly cargo flights are not featured in the timetable, although they can be pre-booked. Departure times for these flights as specified during booking are by definition approximate, with the settlement service optimized on the fly depending on local demand for a given day.

References

Airports in the Arctic
Heliports in Greenland
Upernavik Archipelago